Istituto Eugenio Montale may refer to:

Schools in Italy:
 Istituto di Istruzione Superiore "E. Montale" - Cinisello Balsamo

Schools outside of Italy:
 Scuola Italiana Eugenio Montale -  São Paulo, Brazil